"Morir de amor" is a pop song recorded by Chilean band Kudai and is the third single for their third studio album, Nadha. The release of the single was accompanied by a campaign against gender violence, supported by the United Nations Population Fund.

Song information
The song is the third official single from the album Nadha, and was released as radio airplay in Chile on 19 February 2009. The song was written during 2007 by Carlos Lara and Kudai in Chile. The song contains hard social lyrics and themes like suicide are recurrent in the song and says no to violence. The single was released in the first week of April in México and the rest of Latin America.

Music video 
This music video for "Morir De Amor" was shot in Buenos Aires, Argentina  on 15-16 February 2009. The filming lasted 48 hours and was directed by Ariel Evasio. The video addresses the story of two young people who are entangled in a loving relationship charged with extreme violence, which leads to fear, insecurity and confusion.  Some scenes in the video are strong, "because we wanted people to identify the first signs of this violence that affects women and men."

The music video was premiered in their website Amorsinviolencia.com on March 28, 2009, and premiere on television on 30 March 2009.

Track listing 
CD Single
 "Morir de Amor" (Album Version) – 3:56
 "Morir de Amor" (Radio Edit) – 3:54

Chart performance

References

2009 singles
Kudai songs
Songs written by Koko Stambuk
2008 songs
Songs written by Carlos Lara (songwriter)
EMI Records singles